This is a list of properties contained within the boundaries of the federal government designated Hartford City Courthouse Square Historic District in Hartford City, Indiana, United States. The District was added to the National Register of Historic Places on June 21, 2006.  Over 40 contributing properties, including two buildings that are also in the National Register for their own significance, are included in the list.

Most information was retrieved from two major sources: Historic Landmarks Foundation of Indiana's Blackford County Interim Report (Interim Report) and the National Register of Historic Places Nomination form for the Hartford City Courthouse Square District (National Register).   The National Register was the final source to decide which properties contribute to the historic district.  There are some instances where the sources disagree.  For example, the Interim Report listed all of the monuments on the courthouse lawn as contributing properties, while National Register listed only the World War I monument.  Any additional sources, which were used exclusively in the notes column with one exception, are footnoted.

The list contains information on each property, including its common name. If the building doesn't have a common name that can be attributed to a reliable source, then it is described simply as a "Commercial Building". The address is listed for each structure because it provides a general reference point to navigate the properties of the historic district. Some addresses may change slightly over time as storefronts are altered.  Where the two major sources disagree on a street address, the current address of the building was used.  Four of the categories of information can be sorted. The list's default sort orders the properties alphabetically by street, and then north-to-south or east-to-west.  Linked information on each building's major architectural themes is also listed where available. Images and brief notes, where available, are listed in the last section.

Contributing properties 
These properties are contributing properties to the Hartford City Courthouse Square Historic District. In general this means that they add to the historic character of the historic district.  In the case of this historic district, the property is associated with architecture, commerce, politics, government, or social history.

Notes

References

Historic districts in Indiana

Buildings and structures in Blackford County, Indiana